Anomalotinea cubiculella is a moth in the  family Tineidae. It was described by Staudinger in 1859. It is found in Spain, Palestine, Algeria, Libya and Mauritania.

The wingspan is 15–17 mm.

Subspecies
Anomalotinea cubiculella cubiculella (Spain)
Anomalotinea cubiculella algiricella (Rebel, 1901) (Algeria)
Anomalotinea cubiculella eremica (Amsel, 1935) (Palestine)

References

Moths described in 1859
Tineinae